Lord Frederick Campbell (20 June 1729 – 8 June 1816) was a Scottish nobleman and politician. He was lord clerk register of Scotland, 1768–1816; Member of Parliament (MP) for Glasgow Burghs (1761–1780) and for Argyllshire (1780–1799).

Biography
Frederick Campbell was the third son of John Campbell, 4th Duke of Argyll, and his wife, Mary, daughter of John, 2nd Lord Bellenden. Lord Frederick was educated at Westminster School (1743-6) and Christ Church, Oxford (1747) before entering Middle Temple (1751) and being called to the Bar in 1754.

Although his father had intended him for the parliamentary seat of Ayr Burghs, he instead succeeded his brother Lord Lorne to the seat of Glasgow Burghs in 1761.

In 1765, being very intimate with Mr. Grenville, Lord Frederick was active in the arrangements for transferring the prerogatives and rights of the Duke of Atholl in the Isle of Man (then a nest of smugglers), to the Crown, and in fixing the compensation to be given; but he felt and complained that the compensation was inadequate.

In the same year (1765) Lord Frederick was for a few months Keeper of the Privy Seal of Scotland but resigned in July following the dismissal of the Grenville administration and was succeeded in the office by Lord Breadalbane. Lord Frederick was sworn of the privy council 29 May 1765, made Lord Clerk Register for Scotland in 1768, and confirmed in that office for life in 1777. In 1774 Lord Frederick had laid the foundation-stone for a register house at Edinburgh, and procured a permanent establishment for keeping the records, and received the thanks of the court of session. He was elected Rector of Glasgow University for 1772–73.

Lord Frederick sat in the Irish House of Commons for Thomastown from 1767 to 1768 and for St Canice from 1768 and 1776.

In 1778 he was appointed colonel of the Western regiment of Fencible Men (Argyle Fencibles). In 1786 a member of the board of control for India, and from 1787 to 1793 the joint Vice-Treasurer of Ireland under George, Viscount Townshend, the Lord-lieutenant. As a member of parliament he seems to have been reticent; but it was on his motion in 1796 that Henry Addington was elected speaker of the Great British Parliament. He was treasurer of the Middle Temple in 1803. He died 8 June 1816 in Queen Street, Mayfair.

Family

Lord Frederick was married, 28 March 1769, to Mary, youngest daughter of Mr. Amos Meredith of Henbury, Cheshire, sister of Sir William Meredith, 3rd Baronet, and widow of the infamous Laurence Shirley, 4th Earl Ferrers. She was burnt to death in a fire at their house, Combe Bank, Kent, in 1807. They had two daughters, one of whom, Mary, married Captain Donald Campbell of Barbreck. In 1752 Horace Walpole reported that Campbell was the love interest of society hostess Viscountess Etheldreda Townshend.

Lord Frederick had inherited Combe Bank (or Coombe Bank), near Sevenoaks, Kent, on the death of his father in 1770. His daughter sold the estate to William Manning, MP after his death.

Legacy
A Canadian school was named after him.

Notes

References
 Endnotes
Hely Smith's MacCallum Mores;
The Gentleman's Magazine lxxxvi. 572, lxxxvii. 214;
The Scotch Compendium;
The House of Argyll, Anon., Glasgow, 1871, p. 68;
Collins's Peerage, iv. 102;
 Parliamentary History, xxiv. 297, xxviii.

1729 births
1816 deaths
People educated at Westminster School, London
Alumni of Christ Church, Oxford
Members of the Middle Temple
Members of the Parliament of Great Britain for Scottish constituencies
British MPs 1761–1768
British MPs 1768–1774
British MPs 1774–1780
British MPs 1780–1784
British MPs 1784–1790
British MPs 1790–1796
British MPs 1796–1800
Members of the Parliament of Ireland (pre-1801) for County Kilkenny constituencies
Irish MPs 1761–1768
Irish MPs 1769–1776
Political office-holders in Scotland
Rectors of the University of Glasgow
Younger sons of dukes
Fellows of the Royal Society
Members of the Privy Council of Ireland
Chief Secretaries for Ireland